The District Council of Portland Estate was a local government area of South Australia established in 1859 and abolished in 1884. It was seated at the Portland Estate subdivision, immediately south of the modern township of Port Adelaide.

History
The council was proclaimed on 15 September 1859. It included sections 1128 through 1131 on the boundary of the hundreds of Port Adelaide and Yatala. This being the land south of the Tam O'Shanter Creek and east of the Old Port Reach (Port Creek), stretching eastwards to modern Commercial Road and southwards to Webb Street, the modern boundary of Port Adelaide and Queenstown

The council was amalgamated in to the Corporate Town of Port Adelaide on 4 December 1884.

References

1859 establishments in Australia
1884 disestablishments in Australia
Portland Estate, District Council of